The 1985 United States women's national soccer team was the first USWNT to play international matches. The team played four matches in Jesolo, Italy, at the Mundialito tournament, losing three and drawing one of the matches.

Coaches

Players

Creation of the team

A national women's soccer team had been selected in 1982, 1983, and 1984 but never played together. Club teams had represented the United States in international tournaments, with the Dallas Sting winning the first title for the United States at a FIFA-sanctioned world tournament in 1984. With interest growing in women's soccer, about 70 women, mostly players on University teams, were invited to Baton Rouge, Louisiana to participate in the 1985 Olympic Sports Festival, the first time women's soccer was included among the events. As the players sat on the field at the end of the festival, coach Mike Ryan selected a team of 17 players, all under 25 years of age to play in a tournament in Jesolo, Italy. The team was issued men's practice uniforms and practiced for three days at the C.W. Post campus of Long Island University. Team members were each given a pair of cleats and $10 a day for food, and sewed the "USA" decal on the front of their shirts the night before flying to Italy.

The tournament in Jesolo

The Italians greeted the American team enthusiastically and chanted "Ooosa!" (USA), a pre-game chant that the U.S. team adopted for itself. The U.S. team responded by leading a cheer for the Italian team during a game. The Americans were the guests of honor at a rock concert and Michelle Akers, Emily Pickering, and Linda Gancitano were invited to model clothing for a photo shoot. The Americans were unaccustomed to the large and enthusiastic crowds, numbering several thousand people, attending the games.

All did not go well on the playing field for the American team. In their first match, on August 18, 1985, the Americans, accustomed to a polite women's game as it was then in the United States, were out-played by an experienced and physical Italian team and lost 1–0. Carolina Morace struck the Italians' winning goal. Akers and Pickering missed that game because of injuries. On August 21, the U.S. team found their footing and tied Denmark 2-2, with Akers and Pickering scoring goals. They then lost to England and to Denmark in a rematch.

Results

Aftermath

The team disbanded after the Jesolo tournament. A national team with several new players and a new coach, Anson Dorrance, reassembled in 1986 to play again in Jesolo and at the national soccer complex in Blaine, Minnesota. The team record was better in 1986, with five wins and two losses.

References

External links
 USWNT History 
 U.S. Soccer Flashback series

1985
national